The 'Erelis' (formerly the PS 160) was the first and only car produced by the French car manufacturer MPM Motors from 2016. It is a modified Tagaz Aquila.

Originally named "PS160", MPM renamed its coupe "Erelis" in August 2018. The Erelis was designed as the first model of a range of vehicles developed by MPM Motors in order to offer a sports car at an affordable price. Erelis means eagle in Lithuanian.

The Erelis made its first public appearance at the Paris Motor Show 2018.

Powertrain 
During its development and for pre-series models, the MPM PS160 receives a single gasoline engine, a 1.6 liter Mitsubishi Orion (4G18S) producing .

This change to the Peugeot-Citroën engine is accompanied by its name change.

Equipment 

The MPM Erelis offers only one package with the following equipment:
Anti-intrusion alarm
Air conditioner
LED daytime running lights
18-inch aluminum wheels
Heated mirrors
Sports bucket seats
Audio system HiFi MP3 4HP ALPINE Audio USB

References

External links 

 Erelis page at MPM Motors

Car manufacturers of France
Cars introduced in 2016
2010s cars